A leadership election was held in the TOP 09 party in the Czech Republic on 23 October 2011. Incumbent Karel Schwarzenberg was unopposed. He received 162 of the 169 votes. Schwarzenberg also accepted party's nomination for the 2013 presidential elections.

Results

References

TOP 09 leadership elections
TOP 09 leadership election
TOP 09 leadership election
TOP 09 leadership election
TOP 09 leadership election